Quintin Jardine (born 1945) is a Scottish author of three series of crime novels, featuring the fictional characters Bob Skinner, Oz Blackstone, and Primavera Blackstone.

Biography 
Jardine was born in Motherwell, Lanarkshire, and in Glasgow he studied law. He was work as a journalist, government information officer, political spin-doctor and media relations consultant, over time he decided to be a writer.

Books

Bob Skinner series

Jardine has written 33 novels featuring senior Edinburgh policeman Bob Skinner:

Skinner's Rules (1993)
Skinner's Festival (1994)
Skinner's Trail (1994) 
Skinner's Round (1995)
Skinner's Ordeal (1996)
Skinner's Mission (1997)
Skinner's Ghosts (1998)
Murmuring the Judges (1998) 
Gallery Whispers (1999)
Thursday Legends (2000) 
Autographs in the Rain (2001) 
Head Shot (2002)
Fallen Gods (2003)
Stay of Execution (2004)
Lethal Intent (2005)
Dead and Buried (2006)
Death's Door (2007)
Aftershock (2008)
Fatal Last Words (2009)
 A Rush of Blood (2010)
Grievous Angel (2011)
Funeral Note (2012)
Pray for the Dying (2013)
Hour of Darkness (2014)
The Last Resort (2015)
Private Investigations (2016)
Game Over (2017)
State Secrets (2017)
A Brush With Death (2018)
Cold Case (2018)
The Bad Fire (2019)
The Roots of Evil (2020)
Deadlock (2021)

Oz Blackstone series

Novels featuring Oz Blackstone.

Blackstone's Pursuits (1996)
A Coffin for Two (1997)
Wearing Purple (1999)
Screen Savers (2000)
On Honeymoon with Death (2001)
Poisoned Cherries (2002) 
Unnatural Justice (2003) 
Alarm Call (2004)
For the Death of Me (2005)

Primavera Blackstone series

Novels featuring Primavera Blackstone:

Inhuman Remains (2009)
Blood Red (2010)
As Easy As Murder (2012)
Deadly Business (2013)
As Serious as Death (2013)

Other projects

The Loner (2011)
Mathew's Tale (2014)

References

External links

Quintinjardine.com, Official site 

People from Motherwell
Living people
Scottish mystery writers
Scottish crime fiction writers
1945 births
20th-century Scottish writers
21st-century Scottish writers
Tartan Noir writers